The Monkey Gland is a cocktail of gin, orange juice, grenadine and absinthe  created in the 1920s by Harry MacElhone, owner of Harry's New York Bar in Paris, France. 

Some recipes substitute absinthe with pastis or Bénédictine.

It is  named after the pseudo-scientific idea that grafting monkey testicle tissue into humans would increase longevity, the idea developed by the Russian doctor Serge Voronoff.

References

Cocktails with gin
Cocktails with absinthe